Reginaia ebenus is a species of mussel. It goes by the common name ebonyshell.

The species is listed as least concern by the IUCN, but is endangered in Missouri and Minnesota.

History 
Originally the native range for this extended from around the Twin Cities in Minnesota and the Upper Mississippi, and went all the way downstream to the Gulf of Mexico. Then in 1913, a dam was built on the Mississippi River at Keokuk, Iowa cutting off the northern home range for breeding ebonyshells.

Taxonomy 
The species was once in the genus Fusconaia but is currently in Reginaia.

Occurrence 
It has been found in states like Minnesota, Missouri, Wisconsin, Illinois, Indiana, Ohio, West Virginia and Oklahoma.

Conservation 
In Minnesota pollution and dams have been a cause for its decline.

References 

ebenus
Freshwater bivalves
Freshwater animals of North America
Molluscs of the United States
Endemic fauna of the United States
Molluscs described in 1831
Taxa named by Isaac Lea